Nebria brevicollis is a species of ground beetle native to Europe and the Near East. In Europe, it is found in all countries and islands except the Azores, the Canary Islands, the Channel Islands, Franz Josef Land, Gibraltar, Madeira, Malta, Monaco, the North Aegean Islands, Novaya Zemlya, San Marino, the Selvagens Islands, Svalbard and Jan Mayen, and Vatican City. It has now been reported as introduced in western Oregon, U.S.A., where it has been found in highly disturbed sites as well as in native old-growth forest stands. It has also now been found in Washington State (see external link to BugGuide, below), Northern California, as well as in Southern British Columbia, Canada(See external link to iNaturalist, below). This species is most abundant between October and December, then from January through mid-May.  Although Nebria brevicollis is widely considered to be solely carnivorous, multiple small studies made by enthusiasts have proven that many Nebria brevicollis will resort to eating various types of fungi that can be found in the soil they live on/around.  Studied made by the same individuals have also shown that Nebria brevicollis are semi-social, and will often work together when faced with certain obstacles.

References

External links
Nebria brevicollis Range In North America
Nebria brevicollis at Vancouver, Clark Co., Washington, U.S.A.

brevicollis
Beetles described in 1792
Beetles of Europe